Woan is a surname. Notable people with the surname include:

 Alan Woan (1931–2021), English football player
 Don Woan (1927–2020), English football player
 Ian Woan (born 1967), English football player and manager

See also
 Won (disambiguation)